Outlaw Express is a 1938 American Western film directed by George Waggner and written by Norton S. Parker. The film stars Bob Baker, Cecilia Callejo, Don Barclay, LeRoy Mason, Nina Campana and Martin Garralaga. The film was released on June 17, 1938, by Universal Pictures.

Plot

Cast        
Bob Baker as Bob Bradley
Cecilia Callejo as Lorita Hernandez 
Don Barclay as Andy Sharpe
LeRoy Mason as Jack Sommers
Nina Campana as Lupe 
Martin Garralaga as Don Ricardo Hernandez
Forrest Taylor as John F. Ferguson
Carlyle Moore Jr. as Bill Cody 
Julian Rivero as Don Francisco Diego
Jack Kirk as Phelps
Carleton Young as Ramon
Apache as Bob's Horse

References

External links
 

1938 films
American Western (genre) films
1938 Western (genre) films
Universal Pictures films
Films directed by George Waggner
American black-and-white films
1930s English-language films
1930s American films